The 10th Washington D.C. Area Film Critics Association Awards were given out on December 5, 2011.

Winners and nominees
Best Film
 The Artist
 The Descendants
 Drive
 Hugo
 Win Win

Best Director
 Martin Scorsese – Hugo
 Woody Allen – Midnight in Paris
 Michel Hazanavicius – The Artist
 Alexander Payne – The Descendants
 Nicolas Winding Refn – Drive

Best Actor
 George Clooney – The Descendants as Matt King
 Jean Dujardin – The Artist as George Valentin
 Michael Fassbender – Shame as Brandon Sullivan
 Brad Pitt – Moneyball as Billy Beane
 Michael Shannon – Take Shelter as Curtis LaForche

Best Actress
 Michelle Williams – My Week with Marilyn as Marilyn Monroe
 Viola Davis – The Help as Aibileen Clarke
 Elizabeth Olsen – Martha Marcy May Marlene as Martha
 Meryl Streep – The Iron Lady as Margaret Thatcher
 Tilda Swinton – We Need to Talk About Kevin as Eve Khatchadourian

Best Supporting Actor
 Albert Brooks – Drive as Bernie Rose
 Kenneth Branagh – My Week with Marilyn as Laurence Olivier
 John Hawkes – Martha Marcy May Marlene as Patrick
 Christopher Plummer – Beginners as Hal
 Andy Serkis – Rise of the Planet of the Apes as Caesar

Best Supporting Actress
 Octavia Spencer – The Help as Minny Jackson
 Bérénice Bejo – The Artist as Peppy Miller
 Melissa McCarthy – Bridesmaids as Megan
 Carey Mulligan – Shame as Sissy Sullivan
 Shailene Woodley – The Descendants as Alexandra King

Best Adapted Screenplay
 The Descendants – Nat Faxon, Jim Rash, and Alexander Payne The Help – Tate Taylor
 Hugo – John Logan
 Moneyball – Steven Zaillian and Aaron Sorkin
 Tinker Tailor Soldier Spy – Bridget O'Connor and Peter StraughanBest Original Screenplay 50/50 – Will Reiser The Artist – Michel Hazanavicius
 Bridesmaids – Annie Mumolo and Kristen Wiig
 Midnight in Paris – Woody Allen
 Win Win – Tom McCarthyBest Cast Bridesmaids
 Harry Potter and the Deathly Hallows – Part 2
 The Help
 Hugo
 Margin Call

Best Animated Film
 Rango
 The Adventures of Tintin
 Arthur Christmas
 Puss in Boots
 Winnie the Pooh

Best Documentary Film
 Cave of Forgotten Dreams
 Being Elmo: A Puppeteer's Journey
 Buck
 Into the Abyss
 Project Nim

Best Foreign Language Film
 The Skin I Live In • Spain
 13 Assassins • Japan
 Certified Copy • France
 I Saw the Devil • South Korea
 Pina • Germany

Best Art Direction
 Hugo
 The Artist
 Harry Potter and the Deathly Hallows – Part 2
 The Tree of Life
 War Horse

Best Cinematography
 The Tree of Life
 The Artist
 Hugo
 Melancholia
 War Horse

Best Score
 The Artist – Ludovic Bource
 Drive – Cliff Martinez
 The Girl with the Dragon Tattoo – Trent Reznor and Atticus Ross
 Hugo – Howard Shore
 War Horse – John Williams

References

External links
 wafca.com

2011
2011 film awards